is a park in Setagaya, Tokyo.

Kinuta Park is famous for its cherry blossom (sakura) viewing. It has at least three varieties—Someiyoshino (photo), Yamazakura, and Yaezakura—and this makes for a relatively long hanami viewing season of over two weeks.

Facilities
There are baseball fields, soccer fields, cycling courses and the Setagaya Art Museum.  The 1.66 km cycling course doubles as a walking course outside the hours of 9 am and 4 pm.

History
The park was a wooded area. It was planned as a park in 1935 ahead of the 2,600th anniversary of the legendary founding of Japan by Emperor Jimmu, the mythical first emperor of Japan. After Japan was awarded the 1940 Summer Olympics in 1936 it was planned that the Olympic village would have built either here in the Todoroki Gorge area. After the start of the Second Sino-Japanese War in 1937 the Olympics were forfeited to Helsinki in Finland, (the runner-up in the bidding process) but were later cancelled entirely due to World War II.

In 1957 the area became a public golf course, which was later closed and turned into the park in its current form. The park still resembles a golf course when seen from above.

Access
The Tōmei Expressway (東名高速道路, Tōmei Kōsoku Dōro) runs along the south side; Kampachi (環八, the #8 ring road), along the east. The Tōmei Expressway ends at that intersection.

References

External links

 Tokyo Metropolitan Park Association

Parks and gardens in Tokyo